Kangallı is a village in the Pülümür District, Tunceli Province, Turkey. The village is populated by Kurds of the Lolan tribe and had a population of 41 in 2021.

The hamlets of Alikahraman, Gölgecik, Topaklı and Turluk are attached to the village.

References 

Kurdish settlements in Tunceli Province
Villages in Pülümür District